Our Lady Queen of Angels Catholic Elementary School, commonly referred to as Queen of Angels School, is a Catholic elementary school located in the East Harlem neighborhood of Manhattan, New York City. The school was founded by the parish friars in 1892 and was originally staffed by the Sisters of St. Agnes. Today it is run by lay teachers and is administered by the Partnership for Inner-City Education in conjunction with the Archdiocese of New York. On 25 September 2015, Pope Francis visited Queen of Angels School as part of his New York stop in his papal visit to Cuba and the United States.

History 
The School was founded in 1892 to serve the children of parishioners of the Church of Our Lady Queen of Angels, a parish run by Capuchin Friars, in East Harlem, New York City. The Sisters of St. Agnes served as teachers, although they later left the school in the hands of laypersons.

The parish church was closed with 21 others by the archdiocese in 2007, but the school remained open as an independent entity.

On 25 September 2015 at 4:00 pm, Pope Francis visited Queen of Angels School as part of his New York stop in his papal visit to Cuba and the United States.

Demographics 
In 1921, the school had 13 faculty and staff, all of them religious sisters from the congregation of Sisters of St. Agnes. An additional Capuchin friar served as rector. There were 954 students total, 473 boys and 481 girls.

As of 2015, the school has 18 faculty and staff, all lay. There are 295 students, 70% of whom are Hispanic and 22% of whom are African-American.There is a minority of mixed cultures, like Asians and Europeans.

References

External links 

Educational institutions established in 1892
1892 establishments in New York (state)
Roman Catholic elementary schools in Manhattan
Private K–8 schools in Manhattan